Strong duality is a condition in mathematical optimization in which the primal optimal objective and the dual optimal objective are equal.  This is as opposed to weak duality (the primal problem has optimal value smaller than or equal to the dual problem, in other words the duality gap is greater than or equal to zero).

Characterizations
Strong duality holds if and only if the duality gap is equal to 0.

Sufficient conditions 

Sufficient conditions comprise:

  is convex and lower semi-continuous (equivalent to the first point by the Fenchel–Moreau theorem)
 the primal problem is a linear optimization problem
 Slater's condition for a convex optimization problem

See also
Convex optimization

References

Linear programming
Convex optimization